Benjamin Patterson (May 29, 1934 – June 25, 2016) was an American musician, artist, and one of the founders of the Fluxus movement.

Biography
Benjamin Patterson was born in Pittsburgh on May 29, 1934. He attended the University of Michigan from 1952 to 1956, where he studied the contrabass, Composition, and Film Direction. As an African-American musician, he found it impossible to get a job at a symphony orchestra in the United States, so he started playing with Canadian orchestras. From 1956 to 1960, he worked as a double bassist at the Halifax Symphony Orchestra (1956–57), the US Army Seventh Army Symphony Orchestra (1957–59) and the Ottawa Philharmonic Orchestra (1959–60). In 1960 he moved to Cologne, Germany, where he became active on the contemporary music scene of the most radical, focusing its activities at the studio of Mary Bauermeister and "against the festival." Between 1960 and 1962 he played in Cologne, Paris, Venice, Vienna and other places. At Bauermeister’s atelier, Patterson also met Nam June Paik, through whom he met Fluxus founder George Maciunas and came to play an integral role in organizing the early European Fluxus festivals. Patterson was a founding member of Fluxus and participated in the first Fluxus Festival in Wiesbaden (1962).

Returning to New York and receiving his master's at the end of 1965 decided to retire from art, to live a "normal life". Despite the "retreat" he participated in the São Paulo Biennale in 1983, and his works are featured in the Silverman Collection exhibitions around the United States.

After quitting artistic activity, he continued his career in art. He worked as general manager in the Symphony of the New World (1970–72), as Assistant Director of the Department of Cultural Affairs for New York City (1972–74), as director of development for the Negro Ensemble Company (1982–84), and as National Director for Pro Musica Foundation Inc. (1984–86).

In 1988 he left his retreat, with a solo exhibition of new assemblages and installations at Emily Harvey Gallery in New York. He participated in several Fluxus Festival, and exhibitions of the group. Between 1988 and 2003, he participated in nine group and four solo exhibits at the gallery.  He died in Wiesbaden, during a trip to Germany.

Patterson cited the artists Robert Watts, George Brecht and Dick Higgins as his greatest influences.

Patterson was the subject of an episode of the BBC Radio 4 series An Alternative History of Art, presented by Naomi Beckwith and broadcast on March 14, 2018.

Selected exhibitions

 Pianofortissimo (Milan and Genoa) 
 Ubi Fluxus ibi Motus (Venice Biennale, 1990) 
 Fluxus (Museion in Bolzano, Cortona, Volpaia, Bassano del Grappa) 
 The Fluxus Constellation (Museum 'Arte Contemporanea di Villa Croce, Genoa), Wiesbaden Festival 2002 
 4TFLUXUS (Paris) 
 L'Avventura Fluxus (Museum of the Absurd – Castelvetro of Modena),
 Benjamin Patterson, Born in the State of FLUX/us, November 6, 2010 - January 23, 2011 at Contemporary Arts Museum Houston 
 Benjamin Patterson, Born in the State of FLUX/us, March 31, 2011 – June 26, 2011 at The Studio Museum in Harlem.
 Benjamin Patterson, Born in the State of FLUX/us, June 2 – September 23, 2012 at Nassauischer Kunstverein Wiesbaden

References

External links
 Archivio Conz
 Ben Patterson
 Fluxus Portal
 Ben Patterson sound recordings at Ubuweb
 On Not Forgetting Fluxus Artist Benjamin Patterson by Hannah Higgins at Hyperallergic

1934 births
2016 deaths
American male musicians
Musicians from Pittsburgh
Artists from New York City
University of Michigan School of Music, Theatre & Dance alumni
African-American musicians
20th-century African-American people
21st-century African-American people